Božidar "Boki" Milošević (31 December 1931 – 15 April 2018) was a Serbian clarinetist.

Milošević was born in Prokuplje, Kingdom of Yugoslavia, now Serbia.

He completed undergraduate and graduate studies of classical music at the Academy of Music in Belgrade, where he studied with Bruno Brun. He mostly played folk music. He was a member of the Association of Musical Artists of Serbia and was the second clarinetist of the Belgrade Philharmonic Orchestra.

Teaching
Božidar Milošević was clarinet teacher at the Josip Slavenski School of Music in Belgrade from 1960 to 1968.

Personal life and death
Božidar Milošević's son, Milan Milošević, is also a clarinetist; he lives and works in Vancouver, British Columbia, Canada.

Milošević died on 15 April 2018 in Belgrade, aged 86.

References

Sources

Pedeset godina Fakulteta muzičke umetnosti (Muzičke akademije) 1937-1987, Univerzitet umetnosti u Beogradu, Beograd, 1988
Plavša, D. (1981): Muzika - Prošlost, sadašnjost, ličnosti, oblici, Izdavačka organizacija "Nota", Knjaževac
Stojković, Milica. Bila sam svedok: Muzička produkcija RTB 1976-1992. Beograd: RDU Radio-televizija Srbije, 2011.

External links
Biography, milanmilosevictrio.com; accessed 17 May 2018.
Božidar Milošević Boki, riznicasrpska.net; accessed 17 May 2018.

1931 births
2018 deaths
Serbian clarinetists
Yugoslav musicians
Serbian folk clarinetists
Serbian classical clarinetists
Grand Production artists
People from Prokuplje
University of Arts in Belgrade alumni
20th-century classical musicians